Nguyễn Văn Lai (born 10 June 1986) is a Vietnamese long-distance runner. In 2007, Nguyễn began training at the Vietnamese Army Sports Training Center (Trung tâm thể dục thể thao quân đội) in Hanoi when his talent for running was identified while he was serving in the military.

Nguyễn's family is currently living in Thanh Hóa Province.

References

Cựu anh nuôi Nguyễn Văn Lai chẳng ‘dám’ sai lời vợ dặn (2015 article)

External links

1986 births
Living people
Vietnamese male long-distance runners
Southeast Asian Games medalists in athletics
Southeast Asian Games gold medalists for Vietnam
Southeast Asian Games silver medalists for Vietnam
Athletes (track and field) at the 2014 Asian Games
Athletes (track and field) at the 2018 Asian Games
Competitors at the 2011 Southeast Asian Games
Asian Games competitors for Vietnam
Competitors at the 2019 Southeast Asian Games
Southeast Asian Games bronze medalists for Vietnam
Competitors at the 2021 Southeast Asian Games
20th-century Vietnamese people
21st-century Vietnamese people